Qarah Cheshmeh or Qareh Cheshmeh may refer to:
 Qarah Cheshmeh, Golestan
 Qareh Cheshmeh, North Khorasan
 Qarah Cheshmeh, Razavi Khorasan